Mallepally is located near Asifnagar in Hyderabad, India. It is a locality in Hyderabad District and one of the old suburbs that have existed for a long while now. It is one of the oldest localities to exist in the history of Hyderabad during the time of Nizams.

The major colonies are Vijayanagar Colony, Aghapura Colony, Bazargaat Colony and Sitarambagh. Major landmarks are Badi Masjid popularly known as Tabligi Jamat Mosque (Nizam's era), Glory Cinema Talkies (1935; earlier known as Zia and Sham Talkies), SBH Branch (1973) and Housing Board Colony (1956).

History

Mallepally was built by fifth Asafjahi ruler – Afzal Ud Daula next to the Afzal Sagar tank which was one of the largest tank. Many people from Mallepally emigrated from India to the western countries. In the early 19th century, Malay people used to stay at this place and that's how the area got its name.

In the early 20th century, Hyderabad faced much flooding by the Musi River and subsequently led to a plague which reduced the population. Nizam Osman Ali Khan Asaf Jah VII, who had just come to occupy the throne, conferred with his ministers and city planners to come up with comprehensive plans to improve sanitation and hygiene of the city.

Transport
Mallepally is connected by buses run by TSRTC.

The closest MMTS train station is at Nampally is about 2 km away.

Business 
Mallepally is a market for all those who would love to wander the lanes of an old Hyderabad, giving you the touch of memories of famous Urdu writers and poets. Many residents from Mallepally worked in the Persian Gulf area and returned with their earnings. This phenomenon has brought a variety of cultures to the neighborhood. Many food centers around the market serving Arabian delicacies. This place is mostly known for its shawarma centers.

Entertainment 
This area is residential but it does has Priya cinema hall for families to enjoy their free time.

Famous People 

 Fani Badayuni
 Shaukat Kaifi
 Riaz Ahmed 
 Rai Janki Pershad
 Mohd Sakhawat Ali
 Allama Hairat Badayuni
 Aslam Farshori
 Syed Akhtar Hassan
 Mirza Shafi Ahmed Baig
 Abdul Basith
 Jeelani Bano
 Shabana Azmi

Neighbourhoods

 Aghapura
 Nampally
 Bazar Ghat
 Gudi Malkapur
 Humayun Nagar
 Jhirra
 JiyaGuda
 Karwan
 Asifnagar
 Vijaya Nagar Colony
 Shantinagar
 Mangalhat
 Mehdipatnam
 Masab Tank
 Murad Nagar
 Dhool Pet
 Gosha Mahal
 Seetaram Bagh
 Tallagadda

References

Neighbourhoods in Hyderabad, India